is a role-playing video game developed and published by Riverhillsoft for the NEC PC-9801 in 1992 in Japan only. An original video animation by Group TAC was originally released by Toho in May 1995 in Japan; it was later released also in the United States. The extended franchise also includes a manga series, an illustrated serial novel, and other media.

Development
The video game developed by Riverhillsoft and published by Riverhillsoft and Vic Tokai Corporation for the NEC PC-9801, PC Engine and Super Famicom.

Story 
In the game, the evil sorceress Dynastar (ダイナスター) (voiced by Yōko Matsuoka) challenges Princess Minerva (voiced by Miki Itou), threatening to kidnap all the girls in the world and turn them into monsters. Minerva leaves with her eight personal female bodyguards to defeat Dynastar and her six also female demon generals. The game starts when all their weapons, armor and money gets stolen.

Release 

It was released for the PC Engine on March 25, 1994, and the Super Famicom on June 23, 1995.

A five-issue shounen manga series and a nine-volume illustrated serial novel were also released, written by the game's writer Maisaka Kou and published by ASCII comix and Shueisha, respectively, during the 1990s. An original soundtrack / drama CD compilation was released by Futureland in 1995. Other released included a regular original soundtrack and a CD collection of graphics.

In 2018, the Super Famicom version got a fan translation into the English language.

Reception 

On release, Famicom Tsūshin scored the PC Engine version a 21 out of 40 score, and the Super Famicom version of the game a 23 out of 40.

Anime 

The original video animation Princess Minerva was produced by Group TAC was released by Toho in May 1995 in Japan. It was released by A.D. Vision in the United States in September 1995 and then again in 1998.

The OAV serves as a prequel to the game, telling how Minerva assembled her team of the most beautiful and powerful women warriors, and how she first run into Dynastar who tried to kidnap her and her friends.

Dave Halverson gave the anime version a rating of C. Chris Beveridge of Mania.com gave it a B−.

Cast
Princess Minerva. 
Blue Morris Rui Elmitage. 
Whisler. 
Yurisis Cheloria. 
Tua. 
Dynastar. 
Precission. 
Lakuroa Balbis. 
Kessley. 
K-2. 
Orlin. 
Linealter. 
Hagan. 
Yamaha.

References

External links

Princess Minerva at MobyGames

1992 video games
1995 anime OVAs
ADV Films
Fantasy anime and manga
Fantasy video games
Group TAC
Japan-exclusive video games
Japanese fantasy novels
Japanese serial novels
Japanese role-playing video games
Mass media franchises
NEC PC-9801 games
Shōnen manga
Super Dash Bunko
Super Nintendo Entertainment System games
TurboGrafx-CD games
Top-down video games
OVAs based on video games
Video games adapted into films
Video games developed in Japan
Video games featuring female protagonists
Riverhillsoft games